Anaba may refer to:
 Annaba, Algeria
 Anaba, Djibouti
 Anaba District, Afghanistan